Whitney Mansion is a historic home located at Loudonville in Albany County, New York.  It was originally built about 1840.  In the early 20th century it had two large wings and other features added to create the appearance of a noteworthy Georgian Revival style mansion.

It was listed on the National Register of Historic Places in 1979.

References

Houses on the National Register of Historic Places in New York (state)
Georgian Revival architecture in New York (state)
Houses completed in 1840
Houses in Albany County, New York
National Register of Historic Places in Albany County, New York
Loudonville, New York